Annette Münch  (born 1981) is a Norwegian children's writer, playwright and non-fiction writer. She made her literary debut in 2006 with Kaoskrigeren. She was awarded the Brage Prize in 2014 for the young adult's book Badboy Steroid.

Selected works
 (young adult's book)
 (young adult's book)
 (non-fiction)
Drop Out. 2012. (play, staged at Lillestrøm Kulturscene)
 (young adult's book)

References

1981 births
Living people
Writers from Oslo
Norwegian dramatists and playwrights
Norwegian children's writers
Norwegian non-fiction writers
Norwegian women non-fiction writers